Toby Caulfeild  (1694–1740) was an Irish politician.

Caulfeild was born in Dunamon and educated at  Trinity College, Dublin. He represented  Tulsk from 1727 to 1740.

References

1694 births
1740 deaths
Toby
People from County Galway
Irish MPs 1715–1727
Irish MPs 1727–1760
Members of the Parliament of Ireland (pre-1801) for County Roscommon constituencies
Alumni of Trinity College Dublin